Manyara Region (Mkoa wa Manyara in Swahili) is one of Tanzania's 31 administrative regions. The regional capital is the town of Babati. According to the 2012 national census, the region had a population of 1,425,131, which was lower than the pre-census projection of 1,497,555. For 2002–2012, the region's 3.2 percent average annual population growth rate was tied for the third highest in the country. It was also the 22nd most densely populated region with 32 people per square kilometre.

Lake Manyara is in the northern part of the region. It is bordered to the north by the Arusha Region, to the northeast by the Kilimanjaro Region, to the east by the Tanga Region, to the south by the Dodoma Region, to the southeast by the Morogoro Region, to the southwest by the Singida Region, and to the northwest by the Simiyu Region. The highest mountain in the Manyara Region is Mount Hanang.

Demographics

Manyara Region is inhabited by various ethnolinguistic groups and communities. The latter include the Assa, Gorowa, Kw'adza, Mbugwe, Datooga, Maasai and Barabaig and Irakw, which is the largest ethnic group in the region.

Administration
The regional commissioner of the Manyara Region is Makongoro Nyerere.

Economy
Residents of the Manyara Region are mostly farmers. The region's economy is based on the mining of Tanzanite gems on the Mererani Hills in north on the border with the Arusha Region. Other sources of income are from tourism to the Tarangire National Park, which is entirely located in the region, and Lake Manyara National Park.

Transport

Road
One paved road passes through the western part of Manyara Region. Paved trunk road T14 from Singida connects with trunk road T5 in Babati town. Trunk road T5 from Dodoma to Arusha passes through the region; it is paved from Arusha up to Dodoma.

Administrative divisions

Districts
Manyara Region is divided into six districts, each administered by a council:

Notable people
 John Stephen Akhwari, Tanzanian Athlete from Mbulu District, Manyara
 Fabiano Joseph Nassi , Tanzanian Athlete from Babati, Manyara.
 Gidamis Shahanga, Tanzanian Athlete from Katesh, Hanang District, Manyara
 Frederick Sumaye, 7th Tanzanian Prime Minister

See also
 List of protected areas of Tanzania

References

External links

 
 

 
Regions of Tanzania
States and territories established in 2002
2002 establishments in Tanzania